1943 Meistaradeildin was the second season of Meistaradeildin, the top tier of the Faroese football league system. The teams were separated in four groups based on geographical criteria; the winner of each group would qualify for the semi-finals. Each group had its own qualification format. TB Tvøroyri defeated MB Miðvágur 3–2 on aggregate in the championship final.

Qualifying round

East

Middle
The match was played on 20 June. A second leg was planned to be played on 25 July, but Sand withdrew after the first leg.

|}

West
MB advanced to the semifinals after SÍF and SÍ withdrew.

South

Preliminary round

|}

Semi-final
The matches were scheduled to be played on 22 and 29 August, but ØB withdrew.

|}

Final
Match played on 5 September.

|}

Semi-finals

|}

Final
The matches were played at Gundadalur, Tórshavn. After the first game ended in a draw, a replay was needed to decide the champion.

|}

References

External links
Faroe Islands Premier League at Faroe Soccer (choose 1943)
Faroe Islands League final tables 1942–1950 by webalice.it
Faroese champions list by RSSSF

Meistaradeildin seasons
Faroe
Faroe